Patrice Sorbara (born September 8, 1985) is a former French professional football player.

He played on the professional level in Ligue 2 for SC Bastia.

References

1985 births
Living people
French footballers
Association football defenders
Footballers from Corsica
Ligue 2 players
SC Bastia players
CA Bastia players
Borgo FC players